The Breakthrough Laminar Aircraft Demonstrator in Europe (BLADE) is an Airbus project within the European Clean Sky framework to flight-test experimental laminar-flow wing sections on an A340 from September 2017.

Design

Natural laminar flow is opposed to hybrid laminar flow artificially induced through hardware.
It is difficult to industrialise a wing smooth enough to sustain the laminar flow in operation, due to having very low design and manufacturing tolerances, leading-edge retractable slats, and fasteners, that is aerodynamically robust enough, and can withstand surface deformations and dirt, de-icing fluid, and rain-droplet contamination.

The  metallic outboard section with a carbon fiber reinforced plastic upper laminar flow surface is isolated from the rest of the wing and has two ailerons on each side.
Its wing sweep is around 20° for a Mach 0.75 cruise, instead of 30° for a Mach 0.82–0.84 cruise.
Laminar flow is expected along 50% of chord length instead of just aft of the leading edge, halving the wing friction drag, reducing the overall aircraft drag by 8% and saving up to 5% in fuel on an 800nm (1,480km) sector.

Development

The demonstrator took off on 26 September, 2017.

In April 2018, after 66 flight hours, drag reduction is better than expected at 10% and laminar flow is more stable than anticipated, including when the wing twists and flexes.
Both wings with their carbon fibre upper sustainably generate the desired effect, while the carbon fibre left wing leading edge and metallic right wing leading edge have small differences in aerodynamic effects.
The aerodynamic benefits could be sustained at Mach 0.78 up from Mach 0.75 and next-generation single-aisles could use from the late 2020s.

Tests will continue until 2019 and will include wing contamination and a fixed Krüger flap.

Morphing flaps should be flight tested from May 2020.

References

Further reading

 

2010s international experimental aircraft
Aerodynamics
Air pollution organizations
Airbus A340
European Commission projects
European Union and science and technology
International aviation organizations
Pan-European trade and professional organizations
Research and development in Europe
Research projects